Gedun Gyatso, also Gendun Gyatso Palzangpo ("Sublimely Glorious Ocean of Spiritual Aspirants", layname: Yonten Phuntsok; 1475–1542), was considered posthumously to have been the second Dalai Lama.

Early life 
Gedun Gyatso was born near Shigatse at Tanak as Sangye Phel, in the Tsang region of Central Tibet. His father, Kunga Gyaltsen  (1432–1481), was a ngakpa (married tantric practitioner) of the Nyingma lineage, a famous Nyingma tantric master. His mother was Machik Kunga Pemo, they were a farming family. According to scholar Gene Smith, "the rebirth of the First Dalai Lama as the son of Grub chen Kun dga' rgyal mtshan resulted in the end of a hereditary line of Shangs pa Bka' brgyud pa lamas."

Legend has it that soon after he learned to speak, he told his parents his name was Pema Dorje, the birth name of Gendun Drup (1391–1474) and that his father was Lobsang Drakpa, which was Tsongkapa's ordination name. When he was four, he reportedly told his parents he wished to live in the Tashilhunpo monastery (next to Shigatse and founded in 1447 by Gendun Drup) to be with his monks.

He was proclaimed the reincarnation of Gendun Drup as a young boy – according to some sources at the age of four years, and to others at eight.

He received his novice vows from Panchen Lungrig Gyatso in 1486, at the age of ten, and his vows of an ordained monk from Ghoje Choekyi Gyaltsen who gave him his ordination name of Gedun Gyatso. At the age of eleven, he was enthroned as the reincarnation of Gendun Drup at Tashilhunpo monastery. He received his novice and then full ordination vows.

He remained at Tashilhunpo until he was 16 or 17 but, then, due to "some controversies or jealousy" he had to leave the monastery and went to Lhasa to study at Drepung Monastery.

Buddhist influence
Gedun Gyatso was a renowned scholar and composer of mystical poetry, who traveled widely to extend Gelugpa influence, and became abbot of the largest Gelugpa monastery, Drepung, which from this time on was closely associated with the reincarnation line which eventually would be known as that of the Dalai Lamas. According to Sumpa Khenpo, the great Gelug scholar, he also studied some Nyingma-pa tantric doctrines.

It is said that Palden Lhamo, the female guardian spirit of the sacred lake, Lhamo La-tso, promised the First Dalai Lama in one of his visions "that she would protect the reincarnation lineage of the Dalai Lamas." Since the time of Gendun Gyatso, who formalised the system, monks have gone to the lake to seek guidance on choosing the next reincarnation through visions while meditating there. Gendun Gyatso is said to have been the first to discover the sacredness of Lake Lhamoi Latso.

In 1509 he went to southern Tibet and founded the monastery of Chokorgyel Monastery (Chokhor-gyal) close to lake Lhamo La-tso, about 115 km northeast of Tsetang and at an altitude of 4,500 m (14,764 ft), while the lake itself is at an altitude of about 5,000 m. (16,404 ft).

Gedun Gyatso became abbot of Tashilhunpo in 1512 at the age of thirty-six. In 1517 he became abbot of Drepung monastery and he revived the 'Great Prayer Festival' or Monlam Chenmo in 1518, presiding over the celebration with monks from the three large Gelug monasteries of Sera, Drepung and Gaden (Ganden was the original monastery of the Geluk order, founded by Je Tsongkhapa himself in 1409). He then became abbot of Sera monastery in 1525; Sera had been founded in 1419, by Jamchen Chojey (Sakya Yeshe), a disciple of Tsong Khapa.

His Seat has been Drepung.

Gedun Gyatso died deep in meditation at the age of 67 in 1542.

References

Bibliography
 Essence of Refined Gold by the Third Dalai Lama: with related texts by the Second and Seventh Dalai Lamas. (1978) Translated by Glenn H. Mullin. Tushita Books, Dharamsala, H.P., India.
 Mullin, Glenn H. (2001). The Fourteen Dalai Lamas: A Sacred Legacy of Reincarnation, pp. 86–129. Clear Light Publishers. Santa Fe, New Mexico. .
 Mullin, Glenn H. (2005). Second Dalai Lama His Life and Teachings, Snow Lion Publications, 
 2nd Dalai Lama. Tantric Yogas of Sister Niguma, Snow Lion Publications, 1st ed. U. edition (May 1985),

External links
tbrc.org: dge 'dun rgya mtsho

1475 births
1542 deaths
2
15th-century Tibetan people
16th-century Tibetan people